USS William C. Miller (DE-259) was an  constructed for the United States Navy during World War II. She was sent off into the Pacific Ocean to protect convoys and other ships from Japanese submarines and fighter aircraft. She performed escort and anti-submarine operations in dangerous battle areas and returned home with seven battle stars, a very high number for a ship of her type.

Namesake
William Cicero Miller was born on 18 July 1919 in Thomasville, North Carolina. He enlisted in the Navy as an apprentice seaman at Raleigh, North Carolina, on 20 October 1937. After instruction at the Naval Training Station, Norfolk, Va., Miller was advanced to the rate of seaman 2d class on 21 February 1938 and joined Scouting Squadron 6, attached to the aircraft carrier , on 30 September of that year. He remained with VS-6 into 1941 and became the rear-seat man for Lt. Clarence E. Dickinson, Jr., around April of that year. On the morning of 7 December 1941, they both boarded their aircraft, a Douglas SBD Dauntless, for what was to be a routine scouting flight. They were under orders to proceed to Ford Island and land there to refuel. Enterprise, together with the rest of Task Force 8, would return later that day.

Dickinson and Miller arrived over Oahu to discover the Japanese Attack on Pearl Harbor underway. After one of the sections had been shot down by a Japanese fighter, the commander of VS-6, Lt. Comdr. Halstead Hopping, broadcast the word that Pearl Harbor was being attacked. Attacking Mitsubishi A6M Zero fighters riddled Dickinson's plane, but Miller, already wounded once, downed one and ultimately exhausted his ammunition in the defense of the aircraft until it had been set afire. Dickinson called for Miller to bail out but received no answer. Dickinson managed to get out of the falling plane; but Miller, either dead or so severely wounded that he was unable to free himself from the aircraft-remained with it until it crashed into a cane field. Miller was awarded a posthumous commendation by the Commander in Chief of the Pacific Fleet.

Construction and commissioning
She was laid down on 10 January 1943 at Boston, Massachusetts, by the Boston Navy Yard; launched on 22 February 1943; sponsored by Mrs. Melvin B. Miller, the mother of the late Radioman 3rd Class Miller; and commissioned on 2 July 1943.

World War II Pacific Theater operations
William C. Miller got underway on 19 July, bound for Bermuda. There, she conducted her shakedown before returning to Boston for post-shakedown availability and remained in the navy yard until 27 August, when she sailed for Panama. After transiting the Panama Canal between 1 and 3 September, the destroyer escort arrived at San Diego, California, on the 12th and shifted to San Francisco, California, on the 15th, before sailing for Hawaii nine days later in the screen for Convoy 4796. She returned to the west coast early in the fall but departed San Francisco on 19 October, bound for the Gilbert Islands and "Operation Galvanic".

Battle of Tarawa operations
As a unit of Task Group (TG) 54.9, 5th Fleet, William C. Miller screened the ships of the Tarawa garrison group and patrolled in area "Longsuit" off the invasion beaches into early December. She then guarded the entrance to the lagoon at Tarawa through the middle of the month before departing the Gilberts on Christmas Eve, bound for the Hawaiian Islands.

Participation in major invasions
 
Reaching Pearl Harbor on 30 December 1943, William C. Miller underwent upkeep alongside the destroyer tender  and remained in Hawaiian waters into February 1944. That year was to prove a busy one for the destroyer escort. She earned the other six of her seven battle stars in the next year and one-half operating on screening, escorting, and hunter-killer duties with convoys for the remainder of 1944. During that period, William C. Miller supported the occupation of Kwajalein and Majuro from 29 January to 8 February 1944; the capture of Eniwetok from 17 February to 2 March; the capture and occupation of Saipan from 26 June to 10 August; and the capture and occupation of Tinian from 24 July to 10 August. It was during the Saipan screening operations, however, that the ship avenged the loss of her namesake.

Japanese submarine sighted and sunk
At 2120 on the evening of 13 July, a patrol plane sighted a Japanese submarine submerging some 78 miles from Rorpgattan Point, Saipan, and reported the enemy's position. Accordingly, William C. Miller and the other members of a hunter-killer group –  carrying the officer in tactical command (OTC) – altered course and departed the screen for the transport area to track the submersible. At 0022 on the following day, the destroyer escort and her sisters arrived on the scene and commenced searching.
 
The destroyer escort approached at 15 knots and dropped a 13-charge pattern at 0726. Opening the range after observing no damage, the escort vessel attacked for the second time, dropping a second pattern at 0752, once again, of 13 charges.
 
At 0804, William C. Miller noted pieces of wood popping to the surface about  ahead, one point on the starboard bow. One minute later, a "heavy and prolonged underwater explosion" – estimated to be about three times the shock of a depth charge explosion – shook the ship.
 
At 0806, the destroyer escort laid a third 13-charge pattern that apparently landed atop the submarine, completing whatever devastation had been wreaked by the second salvo. William C. Miller closed the oil slick and debris and lowered a boat to investigate. The ship soon recovered small pieces of cork insulating material; fractured wooden decking; and a fur-lined, Japanese seaman's cap. The depth charge barrage had literally torn the submarine apart. A postwar accounting credited William C. Miller with the destruction of the Japanese submarine I-6.

The Navy, in what seems to be in error gave credit to William C. Miller for sinking the I-6, but due to recent research information presented by "combinedfleet.com", it seems to have been the I-55.  I-6 was sunk in a collision with the freighter TOYOKAWA MARU on 16 June 1944

Continued convoy and anti-submarine operations
The destroyer escort paused briefly at Eniwetok, in the Marshalls, on the 24th before she pushed on for the Hawaiian Islands, arriving at Pearl Harbor on 2 September. William C. Miller returned to Eniwetok at the end of October and then shifted to Ulithi, in the Carolines, where she picked up Ulithi-to-Eniwetok Convoy Number 19 on 5 November. After bringing that convoy safely into port five days later, William C. Miller departed the Marshall Islands on 13 November with Eniwetok-to-Pearl Harbor Convoy Number 21. Making port at Pearl Harbor on 24 November, the destroyer escort underwent ordnance repairs at the Pearl Harbor Navy Yard into the following year.

Supporting the invasion of Iwo Jima
William, C. Miller sortied from Pearl Harbor on 6 February 1945, as part of Task Unit (TU) 51.6.2 to participate in the assault and occupation of Iwo Jima between 23 February and 16 March. She returned to Pearl Harbor in early April, via Guam and Eniwetok.
 
After arriving at Pearl Harbor on 19 June, William C. Miller escorted a convoy to Eniwetok which she reached on 6 July. She soon put to sea to operate in the screen of 3rd Fleet units in their operations against the Japanese home islands. She performed those duties into mid-August when hostilities with Japan ceased.

End-of-War activity
William C. Miller arrived at Ulithi on 19 August but soon sailed for Tokyo Bay as part of the initial occupation forces. She arrived at Tokyo Bay on 26 August and was there at the time of the formal Japanese surrender on 2 September.

Post-War decommissioning
Later that month, the destroyer escort headed home, via Ulithi, Eniwetok, and Pearl Harbor, and reached San Francisco, California, on 17 October. William C. Miller was decommissioned at the Mare Island Naval Shipyard on 21 December and stripped of all usable equipment. On 8 January 1946, William C. Miller was struck from the Navy List. Sold to Mr. Fred Perry of New York City on 10 April 1947, her hulk was subsequently scrapped on 19 November 1947.

Awards
William C. Miller received seven battle stars for her World War II service.

References

External links
 

Evarts-class destroyer escorts
World War II frigates and destroyer escorts of the United States
Ships built in Boston
1943 ships